Cecilia Underwood, Duchess of Inverness (née Gore and formerly Buggin;  – 1 August 1873) was the second wife of Prince Augustus Frederick, Duke of Sussex (sixth son of King George III). Despite marrying, like the Prince's first marriage, their union was in contravention of the Royal Marriages Act 1772 and as such was considered legally void. Consequently, she could not be styled either as the Duchess of Sussex nor a Princess. She was created Duchess of Inverness, in her own right, by Queen Victoria, on 10 April 1840.

Early life
Cecilia's exact date of birth is not known, although it is around 1789. Her father was Arthur Gore, 2nd Earl of Arran; her mother, Elizabeth née Underwood. She was styled Lady Cecilia Gore at birth, the courtesy title of a daughter of an earl.

Marriages
Lady Cecilia's first marriage was to Sir George Buggin, in May 1815. The marriage produced no children and Sir George died on 12 April 1825.

She later married Prince Augustus Frederick, Duke of Sussex, the sixth son of George III, at Great Cumberland Place, London, on 2 May 1831. The Duke of Sussex had already married Lady Augusta Murray in 1793, but that marriage was annulled in 1794 as it contravened the Royal Marriages Act 1772, which required that all members of the British Royal Family seek permission of the sovereign before marriage. However the Duke of Sussex's second marriage also contravened the Act, making it also legally void.

Duchess of Inverness
As the marriage was not considered lawful, Lady Cecilia could not take the style and title Her Royal Highness The Duchess of Sussex. Instead she assumed the name "Underwood", her mother's maiden name, by Royal Licence and was known as Lady Cecilia Underwood. The couple resided at the Duke's apartments in Kensington Palace.

However, Lady Cecilia was not accepted as a full member of the British Royal Family. Royal protocol restricted Lady Cecilia from being present at any functions attended by other members of the Royal Family, as she was unable to take a seat beside her husband due to her lower rank. To compensate for this, in 1840 Queen Victoria created her Duchess of Inverness, in her own right, with remainder to the heirs male of her body lawfully begotten. This recognised her husband's subsidiary title of Earl of Inverness.

Death
The Duke of Sussex died in April 1843 at Kensington Palace and was buried at Kensal Green Cemetery. The Duchess of Inverness continued to reside at Kensington Palace until her death thirty years later in August 1873. She was buried next to her second husband.

Portrayals
Lady Cecilia is portrayed briefly in the 2016 ITV series Victoria, Episode 6 "The Queen's Husband" by Daisy Goodwin, creator of the series and its main writer.  The portion of this episode relative to Lady Cecilia is thus described:  "Victoria curries favour with her uncle the Duke of Sussex, who is unable to present his wife at court because their morganatic marriage was in violation of the Royal Marriages Act 1772. Although his wife was the daughter of an earl, she was not a member of the royal family. Victoria uses her discretion to make her the Duchess of Inverness and welcomes her to court."  In this episode, Lady Cecilia's last name is given as "Buggin", her former married name, and is not cared for much by Victoria for its sound.  But no mention is made later of Lady Cecilia's taking her mother's surname Underwood.  Lady Cecilia's husband, the Duke of Sussex, is portrayed by David Bamber.

Arms

References

1780s births
1873 deaths
Inverness
Hereditary peeresses created by Queen Victoria
Daughters of Irish earls
Inverness
Cecilia
Cecilia
Wives of knights
Burials at Kensal Green Cemetery